Anna Karenina is a 1975 Soviet film directed by Margarita Pilikhina. It was first shown at the 1975 Cannes Film Festival where it premiered out of competition.

The film is a Bolshoi Ballet version of Leo Tolstoy's 1877 novel Anna Karenina with choreography by Maya Plisetskaya who also took on the titular role.

Plot

Count Vronsky (Alexander Godunov) spots Anna Karenina (Maya Plisetskaya) waiting at a train station. He is immediately taken with her. When the two meet again they cannot deny their attraction and dance passionately together.

Cast 
 Maya Plisetskaya
 Alexander Godunov
 Nina Sorokina
 Yuri Vladimirov
 Aleksandr Sedov
 M. Sedova
 Vladimir Tikhonov

References

External links

1975 films
1970s musical films
Films based on Anna Karenina
Soviet ballet films
Mosfilm films